This is a list of transactions that have taken place during the off-season and the 2021 PBA season.

List of transactions

Retirement

Coaching changes

Offseason

Player movements

Trades

Free agency

Signings

Released

2021 PBA draft

References

transactions
transactions, 2021